Taft House may refer to:

in the United States (by state then city)
Lorado Taft Midway Studios, Chicago, Illinois, listed on the NRHP in Cook County
Taft Farmstead, Rochester, Illinois, listed on the NRHP in Sangamon County
Taft–West Warehouse, Des Moines, Iowa, listed on the NRHP in Polk County
Stephen Harris Taft House, Humboldt, Iowa, listed on the NRHP in Humboldt County
Judson–Taft House, Uxbridge, Massachusetts, listed on the NRHP in Worcester County
Taft Brothers Block, Uxbridge, Massachusetts, listed on the NRHP in Worcester County
Aaron Taft House, Uxbridge, Massachusetts, listed on the NRHP in Worcester County
Bazaleel Taft Jr. House and Law Office, Uxbridge, Massachusetts, listed on the NRHP in Worcester County
George Taft House, Uxbridge, Massachusetts, listed on the NRHP in Worcester County
Hon. Bazaleel Taft House, Uxbridge, Massachusetts, listed on the NRHP in Worcester County
 Moses Taft House (Uxbridge, Massachusetts), listed on NRHP in Worcester County
Samuel Taft House, Uxbridge, Massachusetts, listed on the NRHP in Worcester County
Zadock Taft House, Uxbridge, Massachusetts, listed on the NRHP in Worcester County
 Taft House (Chaumont, New York), listed on the NRHP in Jefferson County
William Howard Taft National Historic Site, Cincinnati, Ohio, listed on the NRHP
 Moses Taft House (Burrillville, Rhode Island), listed on the NRHP in Providence County

See also
Moses Taft House (disambiguation)
Taft Building (disambiguation)
Taft Museum of Art